Ashfordia is a genus of small land snails, terrestrial pulmonate gastropod mollusks in the family Hygromiidae, the hairy snails.

This genus is sometimes not separated out from the genus Monacha.

Species
Species in the genus Ashfordia include: 
 Ashfordia granulata (Alder, 1830)

References

 Bank, R. A. (2017). Classification of the Recent terrestrial Gastropoda of the World. Last update: July 16th, 2017

External links 
 Ashfordia at AnimalBase

Hygromiidae